KAJP (93.5 FM) was a radio station licensed to Carrizo Springs, Texas, United States. The station was owned by Roberto Gonzalez, through licensee MBM Radio Laredo LLC.

KAJP suspended operations on December 7, 2015 for financial reasons. On December 5, 2016, MBM Radio Laredo surrendered the station's license to the Federal Communications Commission (FCC). The FCC cancelled KAJP's license on December 19, 2016.

References

External links
 

AJP
Radio stations established in 2009
2009 establishments in Texas
Defunct radio stations in the United States
Radio stations disestablished in 2016
2016 disestablishments in Texas
AJP